The Workers Revolutionary Party (WRP, from 2009 to 2014 named the Communist Party of Namibia) is a communist party in Namibia led by Attie Beukes and Harry Boesak.

The party was founded by Attie Beukes in May 1989 as the Workers Revolutionary Party. It joined the United Democratic Front (UDF) alliance for participation in the 1989 elections. The UDF won four seats in this election for the Constituent Assembly of Namibia, none of which went to the WRP.

Election results

2004
In the 2004 election, the WRP joined with SWANU in an alliance of socialist parties. The SWANU-WRP alliance received 3,428 votes, which were not enough for a seat in the National Assembly.

2009
Under its new name, Communist Party of Namibia, it contested the 2009 general election for seats in the National Assembly and the Presidency.

The party registered for the 2009 election as the fourteenth and final party. Beukes, the party's candidate for president, received 1,005 votes, which was the lowest total of all candidates. The CPN received 810 votes, which was the lowest of all contesting parties and did not qualify them for a seat in the National Assembly. Beukes received his highest vote total in the Mariental Rural constituency in the Hardap Region and the CPN received its highest vote total in the Gibeon, Hardap Region constituency.

2014
The WRP contested the 2014 general election again under its original name, Workers Revolutionary Party. It achieved 1.49% of the vote and gained two seats in the National Assembly.

2019
In the 2019 elections the WRP gathered 3,212 votes for the national assembly (0.39%) and lost its representation in parliament. It did not submit a candidate for the presidential election.

References

1989 establishments in South West Africa
Communism in Namibia
Namibia
Political parties established in 1989
Political parties in Namibia
Socialist parties in Namibia